The Bridgeport Hill Service Station is a group of three buildings on Bridgeport Hill near Geary, Oklahoma. Originally constructed as a service station on U.S. Route 66, it includes a well house, an auto garage, and the gas station itself. It was listed on the National Register of Historic Places in 2003 as an example of a private business constructed to take advantage of the then-newly constructed US Highway 66.

The gas station is a wooden structure with a sloped metal roof and canopy, while the service garage is a metal building on a concrete slab with windows and a single overhead door. The builder of the station, Leroy Tilley, commemorated the well with a concrete slab in front of the well house engraved with the date the well was completed and its depth.

The Tilley family operated the Bridgeport Hill station until sometime after Interstate 40 bypassed Bridgeport in 1962. Joseph Tilley, who owned the station, left it to his brother Leroy upon his death, and Leroy's widow continued to live on the property until at least 1987.

References

Buildings and structures in Canadian County, Oklahoma
Buildings and structures on U.S. Route 66
Commercial buildings completed in 1934
National Register of Historic Places in Canadian County, Oklahoma
Gas stations on the National Register of Historic Places in Oklahoma
1934 establishments in Oklahoma